Casalbuono is a town and comune in the province of Salerno in the Campania region of south-western Italy.

Geography
The municipality borders with Casaletto Spartano, Lagonegro, Montesano sulla Marcellana and Sanza.

See also
Vallo di Diano

References

External links

Official website

Cities and towns in Campania
Localities of Cilento